Isidoro Blaisten (January 12, 1933 – August 28, 2004) was an Argentine writer.

Son of David Blaisten and Dora Gliclij, Blaisten was born in Concordia, Argentina. His family was among the many Argentine Jews who populated rural areas in Entre Ríos Province during the early 20th century. Although born with the surname Blaistein, he would later spell it Blaisten, even though his signature occasionally read Blaistein.

He was a member of the Academia Argentine de Letras from 2001 until his death as well as a correspondent of the Real Academia Española, mixing literature with his profession as a neighborhood bookseller after having been a publicist and child photographer. He collaborated with the magazine El escarabajo de oro and other journalistic media in Argentina.

Works

Stories
La felicidad (1969)
La salvación (1972) 
El mago (1974)
Dublín al Sur (1980)
Cerrado por melancolía (1982)
Cuentos anteriores (1982) (recompilation)
A mí nunca me dejaban hablar (1985)
Carroza y reina (1986)
Al acecho (1995)
Antología personal (1997)

Essays
Anticonferencias (1983)
Cuando éramos felices (1992)

Novels
Voces en la noche (2004)

Poetry
Sucedió en la lluvia (1965)

External links

Biblioteca Virtual Miguel de Cervantes
La salvación

Further reading
Argentina's Jewish Short Story Writers, Rita M. Gardiol, 1986.

Public relations people
Argentine Jews
Jewish Argentine writers
People from Concordia, Entre Ríos
1933 births
2004 deaths